Abd al-Salam al-Hilah is a citizen of Yemen, held in extrajudicial detention in the United States Guantanamo Bay detainment camps, in Cuba.

The Department of Defense lists his place of birth as Sanaa, Yemen and his date of birth as January 30, 1968.

He arrived there on September 20, 2004.

CIA detention

Al-Hilah was captured, in Cairo, on September 19, 2002, while on a business trip.
John Sifton, of Human Rights Watch, says that Al-Hilah disappeared, for eighteen months, before surfacing in American detention in the US naval base in Guantanamo Bay, Cuba.
According to medical records published on March 16, 2007, his "in process date" at Guantanamo was September 20, 2004.

Since his arrival in Guantanamo Bay, he is one of the approximately 200 detainees who has had a writ of habeas corpus filed on his behalf.  In recently declassified discussions with his lawyer, al-Hilah says that after his capture he was sent to Baku Azerbaijan for two months, and then spent 16 months in secret bases in Afghanistan, including "the dark prison".

Official status reviews

Originally the Bush Presidency asserted that captives apprehended in the "war on terror" were not covered by the Geneva Conventions, and could be held indefinitely, without charge, and without an open and transparent review of the justifications for their detention.
In 2004, the United States Supreme Court ruled, in Rasul v. Bush, that Guantanamo captives were entitled to being informed of the allegations justifying their detention, and were entitled to try to refute them.

Office for the Administrative Review of Detained Enemy Combatants

Following the Supreme Court's ruling the Department of Defense set up the Office for the Administrative Review of Detained Enemy Combatants.

Scholars at the Brookings Institution, led by Benjamin Wittes, listed the captives still held in Guantanamo in December 2008, according to whether their detention was justified by certain common allegations:

 Abd al-Salam al-Hilah was listed as one of the captives who "The military alleges ... are members of Al Qaeda."
 Abd al-Salam al-Hilah was listed as one of the captives who was an "al Qaeda operative".

Habeas corpus petition

Abdulsalam Ali Abdulrahman Al Hela v. George W. Bush had a writ of habeas corpus filed on his behalf.

Joint Review Task Force

On January 21, 2009, the day he was inaugurated, United States President Barack Obama issued three Executive orders related to the detention of individuals in Guantanamo.
That new review system was composed of officials from six departments, where the OARDEC reviews were conducted entirely by the Department of Defense.  When it reported back, a year later, the Joint Review Task Force classified some individuals as too dangerous to be transferred from Guantanamo, even though there was no evidence to justify laying charges against them. On April 9, 2013, that document was made public after a Freedom of Information Act request.
Abd al-Salam al-Hilah was one of the 71 individuals deemed too innocent to charge, but too dangerous to release.
Obama said those deemed too innocent to charge, but too dangerous to release would start to receive reviews from a Periodic Review Board.

Periodic Review Board
The first review was not convened until November 20, 2013. Hilah was approved for transfer on June 8, 2021.

Hunger strike

Al-Hilah was reported to have participated in a hunger strike that led to a deterioration in his health.

Children's death

On April 23, 2009, Yemeni newspapers reported two of the four children of Guantanamo captive "Abdul Salam Al Hilam" were killed, in his home, by the explosion of a hand grenade.
The two boys were reported to be nine and eleven years old, and ten and eleven years old.  They were reported to have died when playing with the grenade.

In 2008, camp authorities started to allow compliant captives to make an annual phone call home.
The Yemen Post reports that Al Hila's sons died just two days after his call.

Assassination fears
On August 1, 2009, the Saba News reported that in a phone call after his son's death he told his family that he feared he would be assassinated in Guantanamo. He told his family not to believe accounts that he committed suicide if he should die in Guantanamo.

On May 17, 2010, Saba News reported Al Hilah's family had recently received a letter where he wrote he believed camp authorities had a new plan to assassinate him.

See also

Black site
Detainees in CIA custody
List of Guantanamo Bay detainees

References

External links
 Anger in Yemen Over Halt to Release of Cleared Guantánamo Prisoners Andy Worthington
 UN Secret Detention Report (Part Two): CIA Prisons in Afghanistan and Iraq Andy Worthington

Detainees of the Guantanamo Bay detention camp
Yemeni extrajudicial prisoners of the United States
Living people
Bagram Theater Internment Facility detainees
Guantanamo Bay captives appeals under the Detainee Treatment Act
People subject to extraordinary rendition by the United States
1968 births